Clover Park is a suburb of Auckland, New Zealand. It is governed by the Auckland Council, and is in the Manukau ward, one of the thirteen administrative divisions of Auckland city.

Demographics

Clover Park had a population of 8,922 at the 2018 New Zealand census, an increase of 981 people (12.4%) since the 2013 census, and an increase of 858 people (10.6%) since the 2006 census. There were 1,938 households, comprising 4,425 males and 4,500 females, giving a sex ratio of 0.98 males per female, with 2,448 people (27.4%) aged under 15 years, 2,277 (25.5%) aged 15 to 29, 3,510 (39.3%) aged 30 to 64, and 690 (7.7%) aged 65 or older.

Ethnicities were 14.9% European/Pākehā, 17.9% Māori, 56.4% Pacific peoples, 27.2% Asian, and 1.5% other ethnicities. People may identify with more than one ethnicity.

The percentage of people born overseas was 40.5, compared with 27.1% nationally.

Although some people chose not to answer the census's question about religious affiliation, 21.2% had no religion, 56.9% were Christian, 1.6% had Māori religious beliefs, 7.2% were Hindu, 2.4% were Muslim, 3.7% were Buddhist and 2.4% had other religions.

Of those at least 15 years old, 666 (10.3%) people had a bachelor's or higher degree, and 1,467 (22.7%) people had no formal qualifications. 447 people (6.9%) earned over $70,000 compared to 17.2% nationally. The employment status of those at least 15 was that 3,225 (49.8%) people were employed full-time, 759 (11.7%) were part-time, and 408 (6.3%) were unemployed.

Education

Some classes are taught in Māori language and some in Pacific languages. It was formed in January 2011 when Clover Park Middle School merged with Te Whanau o Tupuranga.

References

Suburbs of Auckland
Ōtara-Papatoetoe Local Board Area